Web Hosting Magazine was a web hosting industry print magazine that published from 2000 to 2002. It spawned a companion tradeshow, Web Hosting Expo. Its founders and editors were Dmitri Eroshenko and Isabel Wang. It was published by Infotonics Media. The magazine was written and edited with a deliberately "edgy" style, designed to appeal to the primarily young and male constituency of the ISP industry.

In 2003, Ping! Zine Web Hosting Magazine was launched, based on the concept of Web Hosting Magazine, and Isabel Wang came on board as a main part of the Editorial Board.  This magazine continued with the edgy style.

Web Host Industry Review Magazine (WHIR Magazine) was born out of the need for a more serious hard hitting news and trade publication in the Web Hosting Industry.

References

External links
Pingzine Website

Professional and trade magazines
Web hosting
Defunct computer magazines published in the United States
Magazines established in 2000
Magazines disestablished in 2002
Business magazines published in the United States
Defunct magazines published in the United States